Time and Tide was a British weekly (and later monthly) political and literary review  magazine founded by Margaret, Lady Rhondda, in 1920. It started out as a supporter of left wing and feminist causes and the mouthpiece of the feminist Six Point Group.
 It later moved to the right along with the views of its owner. It always supported and published literary talent.
 
The first editor was  Helen Archdale. Lady Rhondda took over herself as editor in 1926 and remained so for the rest of her life.

Contributors included Nancy Astor, Margaret Bondfield, Vera Brittain, John Brophy, Margery Corbett-Ashby, Anthony Cronin (literary editor mid-1950s), E. M. Delafield, Charlotte Despard, Crystal Eastman, Leonora Eyles, Emma Goldman, Robert Graves, Graham Greene, Charlotte Haldane, Mary Hamilton, J. M. Harvey,  Winifred Holtby, Storm Jameson, Max Kenyon, Vera Laughton Mathews, D. H. Lawrence, C. S. Lewis, Wyndham Lewis, F. L. Lucas, Rose Macaulay, Naomi Mitchison, Eric Newton, G. K. Chesterton, George Orwell, Emmeline Pankhurst, Eleanor Rathbone, Elizabeth Robins, Olive Schreiner, George Bernard Shaw, Ethel Smyth, Helena Swanwick, Ernst Toller, Rebecca West, Ellen Wilkinson, Charles Williams, Margaret Wintringham and Virginia Woolf.

In 1940, the article "The Necessity of Chivalry" by C. S. Lewis was published in Time and Tide, beginning an association between Lewis and the magazine that would last 20 years and include more articles and reviews. In 1944, Lewis's articles "Democratic Education" and "The Parthenon and the Optative" were published, while "Hedonics" appeared in 1945. In 1946, the magazine published Lewis's articles "Different Tastes in Literature" and "Period Criticism". In 1954, Lewis published one of the first reviews of J. R. R. Tolkien's The Fellowship of the Ring, and in 1955 his reviews of The Two Towers and The Return of the King were published. Lewis also frequently contributed poetry, including his poem "The Meteorite" (7 December 1946), which he used as the motto for his book Miracles (1947).

Another significant contributor was Lewis's friend and fellow Oxford "Inkling" Charles Williams, who contributed regularly from 1937 until his death in 1945. His important articles included a review of the 'B' text of W. B. Yeats's A Vision (1937) and an exposition of his own Arthurian sequence of poems, Taliessin Through Logres (1938).

Time and Tide never sold well; its peak circulation was 14,000 copies. It is estimated that the magazine was subsidised by Rhondda to the sum of £500,000 during the 38 years she owned it.  In 1956, Time and Tide and André Deutsch published a hardbound book anthology of favourite writings titled Time & Tide Anthology, with an introduction by Rhondda and edited by Anthony Lejeune.

With Rhondda's death in 1958, it passed to the control of Rev Timothy Beaumont and editor John Thompson in March 1960. Under their supervision, it became a political news-magazine with a Christian flavour during the 1960s. It, however, continued to lose £600 a week and, in June 1962, he sold it to Brittain Publishing Company, where it was continued by W. J. Brittain. It became a monthly in 1970 and closed in 1979.

The Time and Tide title was later purchased by Sidgwick and Jackson, a subsidiary of the hotel group Trust House Forte. They continued to publish it quarterly during 1984–1986 from their global headquarters in London with Alexander Chancellor as editor. Again, it was propped-up by a very wealthy peer, Lord Forte of Ripley.

The magazine ceased publication in 1979. It was briefly resurrected as a quarterly between 1984 and 1986.

References

External links
The political magazine Time and Tide. Description at Spartacus Educational. 5 August 2002.  Accessed June 2008.
Time and Tide circulation figures at News magazines. Accessed June 2008.
Serials at UKSG. Accessed June 2008.
Tim Beaumont. Bear Alley April 12, 2008. Accessed June 2008.
Centenary project for the magazine. Accessed November 2020.

1920 establishments in the United Kingdom
1979 disestablishments in the United Kingdom
Monthly magazines published in the United Kingdom
Weekly magazines published in the United Kingdom
Defunct literary magazines published in the United Kingdom
Defunct political magazines published in the United Kingdom
Defunct women's magazines published in the United Kingdom
Feminism in the United Kingdom
Feminist magazines
Feminist criticism
Magazines established in 1920
Magazines disestablished in 1979